The Watergate is in Chester, Cheshire, England and spans the A548 road between Watergate Street and New Crane Street.  It forms part of the city walls and carries a footpath over the road.  It is recorded in the National Heritage List for England as a designated Grade I listed building.

Watergate was built between 1788 and 1790 for Chester City Council and replaced a medieval gate that had been damaged during the siege of Chester. The architect was Joseph Turner.  It is built in red sandstone ashlar and consists of a basket arch of short rusticated voussoirs.  The parapet consists of stone balusters interspersed with panels.  A drinking fountain, which is now dry, is fixed to the north abutment and is dated 1857.

See also

Grade I listed buildings in Cheshire West and Chester
Bridgegate, Chester
Northgate, Chester

References

External links 
 The Watergate on 'Chester: a Virtual Stroll Around the Walls'

Chester, Watergate
Chester, Watergate
Chester, Watergate
Grade I listed buildings in Chester
Chester, Watergate
Buildings and structures in Chester
Watergate
Chester, Watergate
Town Gates in England
1790 establishments in England